"Chitta Kukkar" is a Pakistani wedding song sung mainly in Punjabi weddings. One of the earliest recordings was by Musarrat Nazir in 1988 and originated from Gujranwala

Indian remakes
In 2016, singers Neha Kakkar and Gippy Grewal made a remake of the song for the Indian film Loveshhuda. The track was praised by leading Indian websites such as Bollywood Hungama and Rediff.
Its tune was used in Doorbeen ft. Ragini's song "Lamberghini" in 2018 which was again recreated by Meet Bros ft. Neha Kakkar and Jassi Gill in Jai Mummy Di in 2020. Remade once again for the movie Shiddat, under the name “chitta”

References

Pakistani songs
2016 songs
Punjabi-language songs
Neha Kakkar songs
Macaronic songs